Anthony Ingram may refer to:

 Anthony Ingram, basketball player for Northern Arizona Lumberjacks 1985–87
 Anthony Lee-Ingram (born 1988), American basketball player